Paramelita barnardi is a species of crustacean in family Paramelitidae. It is endemic to the Kalk Bay caves of Western Cape South Africa.

References

Gammaridea
Endemic crustaceans of South Africa
Taxonomy articles created by Polbot
Crustaceans described in 1973